Rakhmanov may refer to:

People
Aleksandr Rakhmanov (born 1989), Russian chess grandmaster
Artsyom Rakhmanaw (born 1990), Belarusian footballer
Bakhodyr Rakhmanov (born 1964), Uzbekistani football player
Christine Rakhmanov (1760–1827), Russian actress and singer
Mikhail Rakhmanov (born 1992), Kazakhstani ice hockey player
Sultan Rakhmanov (1950–2003), Ukrainian weightlifter
Vagif Rakhmanov (born 1940), Azerbaijani artist

Places